R. Ed Blackburn Jr. (December 5, 1912 – December 9, 1997) was an American politician. He served as a Democratic member for the 60th and 64th district of the Florida House of Representatives.

Life and career 
Blackburn was born in Tampa, Florida.

In 1968, Blackburn was elected to represent the 60th district of the Florida House of Representatives, succeeding Robert Trask Mann. He served until 1972, when he was succeeded by Roger H. Wilson. In the same year, he was elected to represent the 64th district, succeeding Julian Lane. He served until 1978, when he was succeeded by Malcolm E. Beard.

Blackburn died in December 1997 in Tallahassee, Florida, at the age of 85.

References 

1912 births
1997 deaths
Politicians from Tampa, Florida
Democratic Party members of the Florida House of Representatives
20th-century American politicians